Zoo is an American drama television series based on the 2012 novel of the same name by James Patterson and Michael Ledwidge, the former also serving as an executive producer for the series, which stars James Wolk, Kristen Connolly, Nonso Anozie, Nora Arnezeder and Billy Burke as a group of varied professionals who investigate the mysterious outbreak of violent animal attacks upon humans all over the world.
Zoo premiered on June 30, 2015, on CBS. CBS renewed the series for a third season in August 2016, which aired between June 29 and September 21, 2017. On October 23, 2017, CBS announced the series had been cancelled after three seasons.

Premise

Violent animal attacks upon humans are occurring all over the world. Jackson Oz, an American zoologist and his Kenyan friend, Abraham Kenyatta, a safari guide, as well as Jamie Campbell, a Los Angeles reporter, Mitch Morgan, a quirky veterinary pathologist, and a French intelligence agent, Chloe Tousignant, all seek to investigate the mysterious pandemic as the attacks become more coordinated and ferocious.

Cast

Main

 James Wolk as Jackson Oz, a zoologist
 Kristen Connolly as Jamie Campbell, a journalist
 Nonso Anozie as Abraham Kenyatta, a safari guide
 Nora Arnezeder as Chloe Tousignant, a French intelligence investigator (seasons 1–2)
 Billy Burke as Dr. Mitch Morgan, a veterinary pathologist
 Alyssa Diaz as Dariela Marzan (seasons 2–3)
 Josh Salatin as Logan Jones/Edward Collins (seasons 2–3)
 Gracie Dzienny as Clementine Lewis (guest season 2; main season 3)

Guest
 Brian Tee as Philip Weber
 Tamara Tunie as Brenda Montgomery
 Tamlyn Tomita as Minako Oz
 Jay Paulson as Leo Butler
 James DuMont as Dr. Humbolt Swinney
 Simon Kassianides as Jean-Michel Lion
 Scottie Thompson as Sheriff Rebecca Bowman
 David Jensen as Victor Holman

Recurring

 Ken Olin as Professor Robert Oz
 Bess Armstrong as Dr. Elizabeth Oz
 Benoit Cransac as Pascal
 Henri Lubatti as Gaspard Alves
 Marcus Hester as Evan Lee Hartley
 Carl Lumbly as Thomas Delavenne
 Geoff Stults as FBI Agent Ben Shaffer
 Madison Wolfe as Young Clementine Lewis (seasons 1–2)
 Anastasia Griffith as Audra Lewis
 Gonzalo Menendez as Gustavo Silva
 Michael Scott as Enzo
 Yvonne Welch as Gabriela Machado
 Steven Culp as Clayton Burke
 Xander Berkeley as Ronnie "Dogstick" Brannigan
 Warren Christie as Ray Endicott
 Jayne Atkinson as Amelia Sage
 April Grace as Eleanor
 Tom Butler as Greg Hopper
 Peter Outerbridge as General Andrew Davies
 Joanne Kelly as Allison Shaw
 Edward Foy as Father Pete Harris
 Robin Thomas as Dr. Max Morgan
 Athena Karkanis as Abigail Westbrook
 Hilary Jardine as Tessa
 Sophina Brown as Leanne Ducovny
 Michael Hogan as Henry Garrison
 Delon de Metz as Sam Parker

Production

Development
In October 2013, it was announced that CBS had given Zoo "a rare pilot production commitment for a pitch originating from sibling CBS TV Studios." In July 2014, the series was given a 13-episode straight-to-series order and added to the network's summer schedule.

The series premiered on June 30, 2015, on CBS. On October 2, 2015, Zoo was renewed by CBS for a second season, which premiered on June 28, 2016. On August 10, 2016, CBS renewed the series for a third season, which premiered on June 29, 2017.

There will not be a season 4 as it was cancelled due to low ratings.

Casting
James Wolk was the first to be cast, in November 2014, followed later the same month by Nora Arnezeder and Nonso Anozie. The main cast was rounded out in January 2015, with Kristen Connolly and Billy Burke. In February, Geoff Stults was cast in a recurring role for a "multi-episode arc". In March, Carl Lumbly was cast in a recurring role.

In March, 2016, Josh Salatin and Alyssa Diaz were added to the cast as series regulars in the second season. In April, Joanne Kelly was cast in a recurring role.

In December 2016, Gracie Dzienny, who guest-starred in the second-season finale, was promoted to series regular for the third season. In January, 2017, Aleks Paunovic was cast in a recurring role. In February, Athena Karkanis, Hilary Jardine, and Sophina Brown were cast in recurring roles.

Filming
The series started filming in New Orleans in January 2015. Production for the second season began filming in February 2016 in and around Vancouver, British Columbia, Canada. The third season started filming in mid-January 2017, also in and around Vancouver, British Columbia.

Broadcast
Zoo aired in Australia the day after the U.S premiere, and was simulcast in Canada. It was also aired in the UK and Ireland on Sky One, and in Israel on Yes Action.

Netflix carried the streaming rights in eight countries with many regions losing the show in June 2022.

See also
 Uplift (science fiction)
 Genetic engineering in science fiction
 Viral outbreaks in fiction
 Animal feed
 Food industry
 Techno-thriller
 When Animals Attack!

References

External links
 
 
 
 

2010s American drama television series
2015 American television series debuts
2017 American television series endings
Apocalyptic television series
CBS original programming
English-language television shows
Ethology
Serial drama television series
Teenage pregnancy in television
Television shows based on American novels
Television series by CBS Studios
Television shows filmed in Vancouver
Television series about animals
Television series about journalism